Shorapani is a small Georgian town, situated in the Zestafoni District, part of the region of Imereti. Founded in the 3rd century BC, it served as a residence of the eristavi (dukes) of Argveti (also known as the Duchy of Shorapani) in the Antiquity and the early Middle Ages.

Near the town are the ruins of a fortress, mentioned as Sarapana by Strabo and Sarapanis by Procopius as a strong position on the road that led from Colchis to Iberia.

Legends
Shorapani (Sarapanis) is the toponymy, that is mentioned in old Greek mythology. That was Sarapanis that Jason and his Argonaut friends approached during their travel in old Colchis (Kolkhida).

See also
 Imereti

External links
 Dictionary of Greek and Roman Geography (1854) (ed. William Smith, LLD)

Cities and towns in Imereti
Populated places in Zestafoni Municipality